Harris City may refer to:

Harris City, Georgia
Harris City, Indiana